Vacaville City Coach runs local fixed route bus service in the city of Vacaville, California. Vacaville City Coach also administers two commuter services operated by Fairfield and Suisun Transit (FAST) from the Vacaville Transportation Center to Davis, Dixon, Fairfield, Pleasant Hill, Sacramento, and Walnut Creek.

Route list
4- Ulatis Center to Solano Community College
5- Ulatis Center to Andrews Park via Alamo/Nut Tree
6- Ulatis Center to Andrews Park via Monte Vista/Browns
8- Ulatis Center to Andrews Park via Peabody/Youngsdale

External links

Official website

References

Bus transportation in California
Public transportation in Solano County, California
Vacaville, California